Caudebec is a place name that may refer to two places on the river Seine in France: 

Caudebec-en-Caux, Seine-Maritime, France